The NWA United States Tag Team Championship was a professional wrestling tag team championship contested for previously in the United States-based Jim Crockett Promotions (JCP), World Championship Wrestling (WCW) promotions, with the title now in current use by the National Wrestling Alliance (NWA). The title is only contestable by male tag teams and in tag team matches. In 1986, NWA President and JCP owner Jim Crockett, Jr. introduced the championship to replace and consolidate the old NWA Mid-Atlantic and Georgia National titles, under the name "NWA United States Tag Team Championship", by announcing a tournament for the newly created title, which was won by Krusher Khruschev and Ivan Koloff on September 28, 1986.

In 1988, Crockett sold JCP to Ted Turner, who established WCW as its successor; however, the title continued to be defended under the NWA name until January 1991, when the WCW owned and controlled titles were rebranded. The final champions under the NWA name were The Steiner Brothers (Rick and Scott). Following the rebranding, the title was referred to as the "WCW United States Tag Team Championship". On July 31, 1992, WCW stripped the final champions, The Barbarian and Dick Slater, of their titles and retired the championship in order to put the focus on the WCW World Tag Team Championship.

NWA/WCW United States Tag Team Championship reigns are determined by professional wrestling matches, in which competitors are involved in scripted rivalries. These narratives create feuds between the various competitors, which cast them as villains and heroes. Overall, there are 19 reigns among 15 tag teams, all of which have occurred in the United States. From the information known, The Midnight Express (Bobby Eaton and Stan Lane)'s first reign is the longest in the title's history at 346 days, while The Fantastics (Bobby Fulton and Tommy Rogers)' second reign is the shortest, at 19 days. The Midnight Express also holds the most reigns overall as a tag team and individually, with three.

Reigns

Names 

|}

Combined reigns

By team

Individual

See also

List of National Wrestling Alliance championships
NWA World Tag Team Championship
List of NWA World Tag Team Champions

Footnotes

References
General

Specific

Jim Crockett Promotions championships
National Wrestling Alliance championships
Tag team wrestling championships
World Championship Wrestling championships